Leon Vernon Williams Jr. (born July 24, 1986) is an American professional basketball player.

Career
Williams graduated from the Cardinal Gibbons School in 2004. After high school, Williams played college basketball for Ohio University from 2004 to 2008, during that time he also played in the summer league Belize Elite Basketball League  for the Belize Bank Bulldogs.

After graduating in 2008, Williams started his professional career in Turkey where he played for two years for Pınar Karşıyaka and then Erdemir where he was the top rebounder of the Turkish Basketball League in both seasons.

In 2010, Williams signed with the French basketball team Strasbourg IG, however, after the pre-season and just before the start of the season he left the team and country without notice and without the clubs consent, invoking either a sick relative or a desire to start a career in real estate, Strasbourg threatened sanctions but nothing came from that.

One year later, after the expiry of his contract, he went to Spain to play for Cáceres Patrimonio de la Humanidad in the Liga Española de Baloncesto, the Spanish basketball second division.

Following that season he moved on to Korean Basketball League side Goyang Orions, partly because of his Korean-American's girlfriend desire to discover her roots, he also announced his intention to become a Korean citizen.  After a season in South Korea he moved to  Cangrejeros de Santurce in the Baloncesto Superior Nacional whose season succeeds the Korean basketball season, he would alternate between the two leagues for the next three years.

On January 13, 2016, he signed with Kavala of for the rest of the 2015–16 season. He later re-joined the Cangrejeros de Santurce for the 2016 BSN season. On August 5, 2016, Williams signed with Best Balıkesir of Turkey. On December 4, 2016, he parted ways with Balıkesir after averaging 11.7 points and 9.9 rebounds in Turkish top division.

References

External links
Leon Williams at RealGM
Leon Williams at Ohio Bobcats
Leon Williams at TBLStat.net

1986 births
Living people
American expatriate basketball people in Argentina
American expatriate basketball people in France
American expatriate basketball people in Greece
American expatriate basketball people in South Korea
American expatriate basketball people in Spain
American expatriate basketball people in Turkey
American men's basketball players
Anyang KGC players
Atenas basketball players
Basketball players from Baltimore
Best Balıkesir B.K. players
Suwon KT Sonicboom players
Cangrejeros de Santurce basketball players
Centers (basketball)
Erdemirspor players
Goyang Carrot Jumpers players
Karşıyaka basketball players
Kavala B.C. players
Ohio Bobcats men's basketball players
SIG Basket players
Wonju DB Promy players
Seoul SK Knights players
Changwon LG Sakers players